The 2019 Texas Tech Red Raiders football team represented Texas Tech University in the 2019 NCAA Division I FBS football season. The team was led by Matt Wells in his first season as the program's 16th head coach. The Red Raiders played their home games on the university's campus in Lubbock, Texas at Jones AT&T Stadium, and competed as members of the Big 12 Conference. They finished the season 4–8, 2–7 in Big 12 play to finish in ninth place.

Previous season
The Red Raiders started the 2018 season with a record of 5–2, with their only losses being to Ole Miss and West Virginia. Despite the promising start, the Red Raiders lost their last five games to finish with an overall record of 5–7 and a conference record of 3–6.

Preseason

Coaching changes
Following a 24–35 loss to Baylor in the last game of the 2018 season, head coach Kliff Kingsbury was fired on November 26, 2018. Three days later on November 29, Matt Wells was hired as the Red Raiders' new head coach, having previously been the head coach for the Utah State Aggies. David Yost and Keith Patterson, who both worked with Wells at Utah State, were hired as the team's new offensive coordinator and defensive coordinator, respectively.

Big 12 media poll
The 2019 Big 12 media days were held July 15–16, 2019 in Frisco, Texas. In the Big 12 preseason media poll, Texas Tech was predicted to finish in seventh in the standings.

Preseason All-Big 12 teams
Offensive lineman Jack Anderson and defensive back Adrian Frye were selected to the Big 12's preseason all-conference team.

Schedule

Schedule Source:

Coaching staff

Roster

Game summaries

Montana State

The Matt Wells era of Texas Tech football opened up at home against the Montana State Bobcats. The Red Raiders dominated most of the first half, scoring on their first two possessions. The only score in the half for the Bobcats came in the second quarter, with the drive starting with a Xavier White fumble that was recovered by Jahque Alleyne. On the scoring drive, Montana State converted on a 4th and 4 with a fake punt that kept the drive alive. The drive ended with Casey Baunam throwing a 31-yard pass to Coy Steel for a touchdown. White would later redeem himself in the 4th quarter with a 45-yard pass from Alan Bowman for a touchdown. Montana State would not score again until the 4th quarter, with Tristan Bailey making a 37-yard field goal.

UTEP

The Texas Tech defense held UTEP scoreless for 3 quarters. The Miners' only score of the game came in the 4th quarter with a 45-yard field goal from Gavin Baechle; Baechle had previously missed a 47-yard attempt in the 3rd quarter. UTEP's defense gave up 38 points, but held Texas Tech to under 500 total yards. Alan Bowman left the game in the 4th quarter, finishing 30/45 for 260 yards with 3 touchdowns and an interception along with 7 rushing yards. Jackson Tyner played one drive at quarterback, finishing 0/1 for no yards with 6 rushing yards. On the Red Raiders' next offensive drive, Jett Duffey came in at quarterback, going 1/1 for 4 yards before the game ended. The three Texas Tech quarterbacks finished with a combined 31 completions out of 47 attempts for 264 yards.

at Arizona

The Red Raiders traveled to Tucson, Arizona to take on the Arizona Wildcats in their first road game of the season. In a slow 1st quarter, both teams turned the ball over twice. The first score of the game came late in the quarter with a 1-yard run from SaRodorick Thompson to give Texas Tech the lead. Following the touchdown, Arizona's offense started to pick up momentum and reached the Texas Tech 23-yard line before the end of the quarter. The momentum for the Wildcats carried into the 2nd quarter, with Khalil Tate finding Stanley Berryhill for a 12-yard touchdown pass to tie the game 7–7 following Lucas Havrisik's extra point attempt. Arizona would extend its lead two drives later with a 84-yard touchdown run from Tate, but Havrisik missed the extra point. Texas Tech defensive back Desmon Smith was ejected in the 2nd quarter for targeting. Havrisik attempted to further extend the Wildcats' lead with a 51-yard field goal, but the kick failed. The Red Raiders took a one point lead in the 3rd, but the Wildcats scored 15 unanswered points in the 4th quarter to win 28–14. With the loss, Texas Tech dropped to 2–1 on the season and Matt Wells had his first loss as the Red Raiders' head coach.

On the Monday following the game, it was announced that Alan Bowman suffered a shoulder injury during the game. Matt Wells stated that Bowman would miss several weeks.

at Oklahoma

Jackson Tyner started at quarterback for the Red Raiders, but struggled throughout the 1st quarter. Tyner was pulled late in the quarter and replaced by Jett Duffey; Tyner finished 1/5 for 2 yards.

Oklahoma State

The Red Raiders' defense forced 5 turnovers while the offense committed no turnovers. In his first start of the season, Jett Duffey threw for 424 yards and had 5 total touchdowns in the game. Texas Tech never trailed in the game and defeated Oklahoma State in Lubbock for the first time since 2008. This was the Red Raiders' first home win over a ranked team since September 12, 2013.

at Baylor

Texas Tech played Baylor in Waco, the first time since 2008 that the two did not play one another at AT&T Stadium in Arlington, TX.

The first half of the game was a defensive battle between the two teams. Texas Tech scored only 6 points in the half with two field goals from Trey Wolff while Baylor only scored 3 with a 37-yard field goal from John Mayers. The Red Raiders had 182 yards of offense in the first half while the Bears had 117. Baylor scored the first touchdown of the game for either team on its first drive of the half with a 4-yard run from Charlie Brewer. After trailing for most of the half, the Red Raiders scored a touchdown with 1:37 left in regulation to take a 20–17 lead. The Bears marched down field with Mayers making a 19-yard field goal as time expired to tie the game. Baylor started overtime on offense with Texas Tech on defense. During the drive, center Jake Fruhmorgen appeared to have fumbled the ball on a snap with the ball being recovered by Jaylon Hutchings for the Red Raiders and the play was blown dead quickly. The fumble was overturned as Baylor was penalized for an illegal snap penalty. The call was heavily criticized and the following day the Big 12 announced that the penalty was the wrong call and that Texas Tech should have gained possession.

Iowa State

at Kansas

Kansas kicker Liam Jones missed the initial game-winning field goal, with Douglas Coleman III recovering the ball for Texas Tech. Coleman then fumbled the ball, with Kevin Feder recovering it for Kansas at the Texas Tech 14-yard line with 2 seconds left. Jones would make his second attempt, winning the game 37–34 for the Jayhawks. This is the Red Raiders' first loss in Lawrence, first loss to the Jayhawks since October 6, 2001, and second overall loss to the Jayhawks.

Texas Tech's coach Matt Wells praised Jayhawk coach Les Miles after the game:  "I think Coach Miles brings credibility to that program. I mean, the job that he obviously did at Oklahoma State and did at LSU speaks for itself. He's had success everywhere he's been. And those kids played hard on Saturday. They really did. They went out and, man, they did. They emptied the tank and had every right to win and deserved to win."

at West Virginia

With the victory, the Red Raiders snapped a 5 game losing streak against the Mountaineers.

TCU

The Red Raiders struggled early in the game, with their first drive ending in a Jett Duffey pass that was intercepted by Hyatt Harris near mid-field. At the end of the 1st quarter, Texas Tech trailed TCU 17–0 then trailed 24–3 during the second. The Red Raiders' would score their first touchdown with a 26-yard pass from Duffey to Dalton Rigdon with 10:15 left in the first half. The team would score another touchdown in the quarter, but Trey Wolff missed the extra point attempt, his only miss of the season. Texas Tech's defense held the Horned Frogs scoreless in the 3rd quarter while the offense scored two touchdowns, but failed the two-point conversion after each one, leading 28–27 at the end of the quarter. Neither team scored a touchdown in the final quarter, with Jonathan Song making two field goals for the Horned Frogs and Trey Wolff making a 24-yard attempt. Texas Tech received the ball back with just under 2:30 left to play, but McClane Mannix fumbled on the first play of the drive with TCU recovering it, running out the clock to win the game 33–31.

Kansas State

Kansas State traveled to Lubbock to play Texas Tech for the 2019 meeting of the two schools.  Texas Tech held Kansas State to just six points in the first half, but were unable to continue the success in the second half.  Kansas State managed to force several interceptions—something no other team has done for the season.

In the third quarter, Kansas State's Joshua Youngblood returned a kickoff for 100 yards for a touchdown.  Youngblood credited key blocks from his teammates.

Texas Tech attempted two fake punts and were successful in one of those, but it did not result in a scoring drive.  The successful fake occurred in the fourth quarter with Kansas State ahead by 10.  Tech was on its own 42 yard line on fourth down with six to gain.  The Tech punter Austin McNamara made good on a pass to Ezukanma for 34 yards, taking it all the way to Kansas State’s 10 yard line.  The very next play,  Texas Tech was intercepted in the end zone by Kansas State's Denzel Goolsby to stop the drive.

With one regular season game left to play, Kansas State's Chris Klieman tied the school record for the most wins by a first-year Kansas State head football coach.  The Red Raiders were eliminated from bowl contention with the loss.  The final score was close:  Texas Tech 27, Kansas State 30.

at Texas

Statistics

Scoring
Scores against non-conference opponents

Scores against the Big 12

Scores against all opponents

Offense

Special teams

Weekly awards
 Big 12 Offensive Player of the Week
Jett Duffey (week 6 vs. Oklahoma State)

 Big 12 Defensive Player of the Week
Jordyn Brooks (week 6 vs. Oklahoma State)

 Big 12 Special Teams Player of the Week
Trey Wolff (week 6 vs. Oklahoma State)

 Bronco Nagurski Defensive Player of the Week
Jordyn Brooks (Week 6 vs. Oklahoma State)

 Davey O'Brien Quarterback of the Week
Jett Duffey (week 6 vs. Oklahoma State)

 Maxwell Award Player of the Week
Jett Duffey (week 6 vs. Oklahoma State)

Players drafted into the NFL

References

Texas Tech
Texas Tech Red Raiders football seasons
Texas Tech Red Raiders football